Handball, for the 2013 Bolivarian Games, took place from 17 November to 21 November 2013.

Medal summary

References

Events at the 2013 Bolivarian Games
2013 in handball
2013 Bolivarian Games